Pam Rodriguez is an American glamour model of Guatemalan and Puerto Rican descent.

Personal information
Rodriguez was born and raised in Los Angeles, California.  She is fluent in both Spanish and English.

Career
Rodriguez began modeling in 2003, and appeared on the cover of Open Your Eyes magazine in 2008. She has also appeared in several other publications, including FHM, Lowrider, and Smooth.

In 2009 she launched a swimwear line known as "Pure Rodri."

References

External links
 Pam Rodriguez on Myspace

Year of birth missing (living people)
Living people
American female models
American people of Guatemalan descent
American people of Puerto Rican descent
People from Los Angeles
Female models from California